The Featherstone Rovers competed in the Co-operative Championship in 2009.

Table

2009 Fixtures and results

2009 Squad
As of 25 December 2008:

2009 Transfers In

2009 Transfers Out

External links
 Rovers' official website

Featherstone Rovers season
Featherstone Rovers
English rugby league club seasons